A Little Madonna is a 1914 American silent drama film, directed by Ulysses Davis.

Cast
 William Desmond Taylor
 Patricia Palmer	
 Charles Bennett	
 Jane Novak		
 Loyola O'Connor		
 Anne Schaefer

External links
 

1914 films
American black-and-white films
American silent short films
Vitagraph Studios short films
1914 drama films
1914 short films
Silent American drama films
1910s American films